Blushing is the reddening of a person's face due to psychological reasons. It is normally involuntary and triggered by emotional stress associated with passion, embarrassment, shyness, fear, anger, or romantic stimulation.

Severe blushing is common in people who have social anxiety in which the person experiences extreme and persistent anxiety in social and performance situations.

Summary 
Blushing is generally distinguished, despite a close physiological relation, from flushing, which is more intensive and extends over more of the body, and seldom has a mental source. If redness persists for abnormal amounts of time after blushing, then it may be considered an early sign of rosacea. Idiopathic craniofacial erythema is a medical condition where a person blushes strongly with little or no provocation. Just about any situation can bring on intense blushing and it may take one or two minutes for the blush to disappear. Severe blushing can make it difficult for the person to feel comfortable in either social or professional situations. People who have social phobia are particularly prone to idiopathic craniofacial erythema. Psychological treatments and medication can help control blushing.

Some people are very sensitive to emotional stress. Given a stimulus such as embarrassment, the person's sympathetic nervous system will cause blood vessels to open wide, flooding the skin with blood and resulting in reddening of the face. In some people, the ears, neck and upper chest may also blush. As well as causing redness, blushing can sometimes make the affected area feel hot.

Physiology
A blush is a reddening of the cheeks and forehead brought about by increased capillary blood flow in the skin. It can also extend to the ears, neck and upper chest, an area termed the 'blush region'.

There is evidence that the blushing region is anatomically different in structure. The facial skin, for example, has more capillary loops per unit area and generally more vessels per unit volume than other skin areas. In addition, blood vessels of the cheek are wider in diameter, are nearer the surface, and visibility is less diminished by tissue fluid. These specific characteristics of the architecture of the facial vessels led Wilkin in an overview of possible causes of facial flushing to the following conclusion: "[...] increased capacity and greater visibility can account for the limited distribution of flushing".

Evidence for special vasodilation mechanisms was reported by Mellander and his colleagues (Mellander, Andersson, Afzelius, & Hellstrand. 1982). They studied buccal segments of the human facial veins in vitro. Unlike veins from other areas of the skin, facial veins responded with an active myogenic contraction to passive stretch and were therefore able to develop an intrinsic basal tone. Additionally Mellander et al. showed that the veins in this specific area were also supplied with beta-adrenoceptors in addition to the common alpha-adrenoceptors. These beta-adrenoceptors could exert a dilator mechanism on the above-described basal tone of the facial cutaneous venous plexus. Mellander and his colleagues propose that this mechanism is involved in emotional blushing. Drummond has partially confirmed this effect by pharmacological blocking experiments (Drummond. 1997). In a number of trials, he blocked both alpha-adrenergic receptors (with phentolamine) and beta-adrenergic receptors (with propranolol introduced
transcutaneously by iontophoresis). Blushing was measured at the forehead using a dual channel laser Doppler flowmeter. Subjects were undergraduate students divided into frequent and infrequent blushers according to self-report. Their mean age was 22.9 years, which is especially favorable for assessing blushing, since young subjects are more likely to blush and blush more intensively. The subjects underwent several procedures, one of which was designed to produce blushing. Alpha-adrenergic blockade with phentolamine had no influence on the amount of blushing in frequent or in infrequent blushers, indicating that release of sympathetic vasoconstrictor tone does not substantially influence blushing. This result was expected since vasoconstrictor tone in the facial area is known to be generally low (van der Meer. 1985). Beta-adrenergic blockade with propranolol on the other hand decreased blushing in both frequent and infrequent blushers. However, despite complete blockade, blood flow still increased substantially during the embarrassment and blushing inducing procedure. Additional vasodilator mechanisms must therefore be involved.

Psychology
Charles Darwin devoted Chapter 13 of his 1872 The Expression of the Emotions in Man and Animals to complex emotional states including self-attention, shame, shyness, modesty and blushing. He described blushing as "... the most peculiar and most human of all expressions."

Several different psychological and psycho-physiological mechanisms for blushing have been hypothesized by Crozier (2010): "An explanation that emphasizes the blush's visibility proposes that when we feel shame we communicate our emotion to others and in doing so we send an important signal to them. It tells them something about us. It shows that we are ashamed or embarrassed, that we recognise that something is out of place. It shows that we are sorry about this. It shows that we want to put things right. To blush at innuendo is to show awareness of its implications and to display modesty that conveys that you are not brazen or shameless. The blush makes a particularly effective signal because it is involuntary and uncontrollable. Of course, a blush can be unwanted [but the] costs to the blusher on specific occasions are outweighed by the long-term benefits of being seen as adhering to the group and by the general advantages the blush provides: indeed the costs may enhance the signal's perceived value." A number of techniques may be used to help prevent or reduce blushing.

It has also been suggested that blushing and flushing are the visible manifestations of the physiological rebound of the basic instinctual fight/flight mechanism, when physical action is not possible.

See also
 Endoscopic thoracic sympathectomy

References

Further reading

Vickers, S., MyBlushingCure.com: Free Information from a former blusher, Australian Publisher, 2012
Crozier, W. R., Blushing and the Social Emotions: The Self Unmasked, Basingstoke, Palgrave Macmillan, 2006. 
Miller, R. S., Embarrassment: Poise and Peril in Everyday Life, Guilford Press, 1997. 
Jadresic, E., When Blushing Hurts: Overcoming Abnormal Facial Blushing (2nd edition, expanded and revised), iUniverse, 2014. .
Daniels B. W Understanding Uncontrollable Facial Blushing, Neptune, Elizabeth Stewart, 2010.
ESFB Channel - The online community for people suffering from facial blushing, excessive sweating, rosacea and social phobia
 - Blushing in Plato

Reflexes
Emotion